Perso may refer to:

Prefix
 Perso, a prefix used when referring to Persian language
 e.g. Persophone,  a person who speaks Persian
 Perso, a prefix used when referring to Persia (Iran), a country
 Termine facente parte della celebre lista dei Persi del pallanuotista talsanese Bombertoletti7

Other uses
 A name in Greek mythology, see Graeae

See also